Lesley Magnus (born October 6, 1977 in Tisdale, Saskatchewan) is a field hockey player from Oliver, British Columbia, Canada, who was first selected with the Women's National Team for the 2000 Test Series against the United States. The resident of Vancouver earned her first cap on July 10. Magnus was also selected for the 2000 European Tour (Germany and the Netherlands), and the 2002 European Tour (Scotland and Wales).

International Senior Tournaments
 2003 – Pan American Games, Santo Domingo (5th)
 2004 – Pan Am Cup, Bridgetown, Barbados (3rd)

References

1977 births
Living people
Sportspeople from British Columbia
Canadian female field hockey players
Canadian people of Swedish descent
Sportspeople from Saskatchewan
People from Tisdale, Saskatchewan
University of British Columbia alumni
21st-century Canadian women